The Jenoure Baronetcy, of Much Dunmow in the County of Essex, was a title in the Baronetage of England.  It was created on 30 July 1628 for Kenelm Jenoure. The title became extinct on the death of the sixth Baronet in 1755.

Jenoure baronets, of Much Dunmow (1628)
Sir Kenelm Jenoure, 1st Baronet (died 1629)
Sir Andrew Jenoure, 2nd Baronet (died )
Sir Maynard Jenoure, 3rd Baronet (c. 1667 – c. 1710)
Sir John Jenoure, 4th Baronet (died 1739)
Sir Richard Day Jenoure, 5th Baronet (c. 1718 – 1744)
Sir John Jenoure, 6th Baronet (died 1755)

References

Extinct baronetcies in the Baronetage of England